Axis Mutual Fund is an asset management company in India. It was established in the year 2009 and has its headquarter in Mumbai.

Axis Mutual Fund offers various types of mutual fund schemes to invest in India, such as equity funds, hybrid funds, debt funds, and more.

History
Axis Mutual Fund started its operations in 2009 with its first equity scheme, Axis Equity Fund.

In April 2012, Schroders, an asset management company, acquired a 25% stake in Axis Mutual Fund.

In September 2019, Axis Mutual Fund launched an index fund based on Nifty 100 that is known as Axis Nifty 100 Index fund. On 22 January 2020, the company launched ESG fund.

Controversy 
Two fund managers of Axis Mutual Fund allegedly shared confidential information about the asset manager’s trades with brokers in Gujarat in return for kickbacks, according to new details discovered by a Securities and Exchange Board of India (SEBI) investigation.

See also
 Mutual funds in India
Axis Bank

References

External links
 

Financial services companies based in Mumbai
Mutual funds of India
Axis Bank
2009 establishments in Maharashtra
Indian companies established in 2009
Financial services companies established in 2009